Conasprella kantangana is a species of sea snail, a marine gastropod mollusk in the family Conidae, the cone snails and their allies.

Description
The length of the shell varies between 29 mm and 27.4 mm.

Distribution
This marine species occurs in the Indian Ocean and off Western Thailand.

References

External links
 Gastropods.com: Conasprella (Fusiconus) longurionis kantanganus (var.)

kantangana
Gastropods described in 1982